Nordens Ark (Ark of the North) is a zoo located on the  Åby Manor in Bohuslän, Sweden. Nordens Ark was opened in 1989 and is operated by the Nordens Ark Foundation (Swedish: Stiftelsen Nordens Ark). Nordens Ark is on the west coast of Sweden, not far from the border with Norway. Victoria, Crown Princess of Sweden, was appointed as Nordens Ark Supreme Protector in 1989.

Nordens Ark has been a member of the European Association of Zoos and Aquaria (EAZA) since 1992 and the World Association of Zoos and Aquariums (WAZA) since 1994.

Nordens Ark is open to visitors every day of the year and receives around 100,000 visitors per annum.

History

Historic letters show that King Håkon of Norway lived at Åby Manor in 1307, establishing that the manor is at least that old and making it one of Bohuslän's oldest estates. In 1661, Margareta Hvitfeldt purchased the property, consisting of some 90 farms and cottages. After her death in 1683, the property was managed until 1975 by the scholarship fund that inherited her wealth. The Agricultural Society in Gothenburg and Bohus County purchased the property at this time, and held it until 1996. The dwelling house at the manor was built in 1729, and parts of the  barn, the largest timbered structure in Bohuslän, are believed to date back to the 17th century.

The Bohus Breeding Center Foundation (Stiftelsen Bohus Avelscentrum) was founded on 8 March 1988 and Nordens Ark was inaugurated by Carl XVI Gustaf of Sweden on 14 June 1989. In 1996 the foundation purchased Åby Manor from Aby manor from the Agricultural Society in Gothenburg and Bohus County. In 1997, the name of the foundation was changed to the current Nordens Ark Foundation (Stiftelsen Nordens Ark), and in 1999 Nordens Ark created The Farm and opened to the public.

Animals

 Bohuslän-dal black poultry
 Dala sheep
 Mountain cattle
 Gotland rabbit
 Gotlandsruss
 Gute sheep
 Jämtland goat
 Linderöd pig
 The Nordic bee
 Nordsvensk horse
 Orust poultry
 Polled cattle
 Swedish blue duck
 Longwool sheep
 Öland goose

 Amur leopard
 Amur tiger
 Eurasian eagle owl
 Bald ibis
 European wild cat
 Lesser white-fronted goose
 Snowy owl
 White-naped crane
 Red-crowned crane
 Wolverine
 Great grey owl
 Eurasian lynx
 Maned wolf
 Red panda
 Peregrine falcon
 Przewalski horse
 European forest reindeer
 Tadjiik markhor
 Ural owl
 Rocky mountain goat
 Snow leopard
 Pudu
 Tadjiikistan urial sheep
 Eurasian otter
 Grey wolf
 White-backed woodpecker
 White stork

 Giant marine toad
 Bamboo tree frog
 European pond tortoise
 Wels catfish
 Gotland grass snake
 Green toad
 Yellow-banded poison arrow frog
 Pool frog
 Smooth snake
 Adder
 Red-necked pond turtle
 European fire-bellied toad
 Agile frog
 Common toad
 Annam leaf turtle
 Moor frog
 Edible toad
 European tree frog
 Smooth newt
 Carvalho's Surinam toad
 Sand lizard
 Viviparous lizard
 Grass snake
 Natterjack toad
 Giant day gecko
 Great crested newt
 Common frog

Quarantine and breeding

Quarantine and breeding take place in a separate part of the park called Lunden, which is not accessible to the public. This area includes separate quarantine areas for predators, birds, and ungulates.

There are three categories of breeding and rearing work at the park.
 Endangered old Nordic breeds.
 Endangered Nordic wild mammals, birds, amphibians, reptiles and insects.
 Endangered exotic wild mammals, birds, amphibians, reptiles and insects that come from an environment similar to the Nordic. There are exceptions when it comes to amphibians and reptiles.

Projects
Nordens Ark has participated or is currently taking part in re-population projects, to release animals born at the facility into the wild, including the white stork, eagle owl, bell frog, otter, European wildcat, and lynx.

The park has a national responsibility for rearing and reintroduction of the white-backed woodpecker, peregrine falcon, green toad, lesser white-fronted goose, and several species of beetle.

Foundation
Nordens ark is owned and run by the Nordens Ark Foundation (Swedish: Stiftelsen Nordens Ark) which owns the  Åby Manor. This foundation is supported by gifts, donations, and commercial and private sponsors.

References

External links

Zoos in Sweden
Buildings and structures in Västra Götaland County
Tourist attractions in Västra Götaland County
1989 establishments in Sweden
Zoos established in 1989